Abanico may refer to:

Abanico, the Spanish word for hand fan
Abanico (music), a drum roll and rimshot played on timbales to introduce a new section
Abanico ibérico, a Spanish cut of pork

See also
 Abaniko, a Filipino hand fan